Dmytro Yaremko (6 October 1879 – 3 October 1916) was a Ukrainian Greek Catholic clandestine hierarch. He was an auxiliary bishop of the Ukrainian Catholic Archeparchy of Lviv and titular bishop of Ostroh from 1914 to 1916.

Born in Hayok, Austria-Hungary Empire (present day – Ukraine) in 1879 in the peasant family of the Greek-Catholics. He graduated the faculty of theology in Lviv University and was ordained a priest on 21 August 1904 for the Ukrainian Catholic Archeparchy of Lviv and served as vice-rector of the Lviv Theological Seminary.  He was arrested by the Russian troops and exiled to Kiev, where on 22 September 1914 he was clandestinely consecrated to the Episcopate as auxiliary bishop. The principal and single consecrator was Metropolitan Andriy Sheptytskyi.

He died imprisoned in Vologda, Russian Empire on 3 October 1916.

References 

1879 births
1916 deaths
People from the Kingdom of Galicia and Lodomeria
Ukrainian Austro-Hungarians
20th-century Eastern Catholic bishops
Eastern Catholic Servants of God
Bishops of the Ukrainian Greek Catholic Church
Bishops in Ukraine
Ukrainian people who died in prison custody
Prisoners who died in Russian detention